The Indiana Code is the code of laws for the U.S. state of Indiana. The contents are the codification of all the laws currently in effect within Indiana. With roots going all the way back to the Northwest Ordinance of 1787, the laws of Indiana have been revised many times.  The current approach to updating Indiana Code began in 1971 when the Indiana Statute Revision Commission began a complete rearrangement.  The first official edition of the Indiana Code was published in 1976, and is regularly updated through the Office of Code Revision in the Legislative Services Agency.

Organization
An act of Congress, approved by the president on May 7, 1800, established the Indiana Territory as a separate governmental unit.  The first General Assembly of the Indiana Territory met on July 29, 1805 and shortly after the Revised Statutes of 1807 was the official body of law.  Indiana's constitution, adopted in 1816, specified that all laws in effect for the Territory would be considered laws of the state, until they expired or were repealed.  Indiana laws were revised many times over the years, but the current approach to updating the code in a regular manner began in 1971.  A special agency was established to reorganize the entire body of law for the State of Indiana, leading to the development of 36 distinct Titles that correspond to subject categories.  

The first official edition of the Indiana Code was published by West Publishing Company, under direction of the Indiana Legislative Council.  Responsibility for publishing the Code was later assumed by the Legislative Services Agency, through the Office of Code Revision and working with the Code Revision Commission. The current version of the Code, along with archived material, can be found at the Indiana General Assembly website:  iga.in.gov

Titles
Title 1. GENERAL PROVISIONS
Title 2. GENERAL ASSEMBLY
Title 3. ELECTIONS
Title 4. STATE OFFICES AND ADMINISTRATION
Title 5. STATE AND LOCAL ADMINISTRATION
Title 6. TAXATION
Title 7. ALCOHOL AND TOBACCO
Title 8. UTILITIES AND TRANSPORTATION
Title 9. MOTOR VEHICLES
Title 10. PUBLIC SAFETY
Title 11. CORRECTIONS
Title 12. HUMAN SERVICES
Title 13. ENVIRONMENT
Title 14. NATURAL AND CULTURAL RESOURCES
Title 15. AGRICULTURE AND ANIMALS
Title 16. HEALTH
Title 17. REPEALED
Title 18. REPEALED
Title 19. REPEALED
Title 20. EDUCATION
Title 21. HIGHER EDUCATION
Title 22. LABOR AND SAFETY
Title 23. BUSINESS AND OTHER ASSOCIATIONS
Title 24. TRADE REGULATION
Title 25. PROFESSIONS AND OCCUPATIONS
Title 26. COMMERCIAL LAW
Title 27. INSURANCE
Title 28. FINANCIAL INSTITUTIONS
Title 29. PROBATE
Title 30. TRUSTS AND FIDUCIARIES
Title 31. FAMILY LAW AND JUVENILE LAW
Title 32. PROPERTY
Title 33. COURTS AND COURT OFFICERS
Title 34. CIVIL LAW AND PROCEDURE
Title 35. CRIMINAL LAW AND PROCEDURE
Title 36. LOCAL GOVERNMENT

See also
Alcohol laws of Indiana
Capital punishment in Indiana
Constitution of Indiana
Government of Indiana
Gun laws in Indiana

References

Sources

 History of Official Indiana Statutes, 2016 Replacement Volume, Indiana Code, Titles 1 to 3, Edited and Published by the Office of Code Revision, Legislative Services Agency, Under the Direction of the Indiana Legislative Council.

External links

Indiana Code and Constitution from FindLaw

Indiana law
United States state legal codes